Patrick Duncan may refer to:

Sir Patrick Duncan (South African politician) (1870–1943), Governor-General of South Africa 
Patrick Sheane Duncan (born 1947), American writer, film producer and director
Paddy Duncan (1894–1949), Irish footballer
Patrick Duncan (anti-apartheid activist) (1918–1967)
Pat Duncan (baseball) (1893–1960), baseball player
Pat Duncan (born 1960), Canadian Liberal politician